A Brief Introduction To Unnatural Lightyears is the debut album by English musician Oliver Wilde, released on 23 June 2013 through Howling Owl.

Critical reception

At the Album of the Year website, which assigns a normalized rating out of 100 to reviews from mainstream publications, A Brief Introduction to Unnatural Lightyears received an average score of 82, based on 6 reviews, placing it as the 14th highest reviewed album of 2013 by critics. Samme Maine of Drowned in Sound wrote, "As striking as it is beautiful, on A Brief Introduction to Unnatural Light Years, Oliver Wilde has crafted something truly unique."

Accolades

Track listing

Personnel

 Oliver Wilde – writing, production, recording

Release history

References 

2013 debut albums
Oliver Wilde albums